East Township is one of the fourteen townships of Carroll County, Ohio, United States. As of the 2020 census, the population was 808.

Geography
Located in the northeastern corner of the county, it borders the following townships:
Hanover Township, Columbiana County - northeast
Franklin Township, Columbiana County - east
Fox Township - southeast
Washington Township - southwest
Augusta Township - west
West Township, Columbiana County - northwest

No municipalities are located in East Township.

Name and history
It is the only East Township statewide.

This township was originally under the name of Franklin Township, in Columbiana County. It contains three rows of sections out of the original surveyed township 14, range 4, together with six sections taken off Augusta Township by the county commissioners.

Government

The township is governed by a three-member board of trustees, who are elected in November of odd-numbered years to a four-year term beginning on the following January 1. Two are elected in the year after the presidential election and one is elected in the year before it. There is also an elected township fiscal officer, who serves a four-year term beginning on April 1 of the year after the election, which is held in November of the year before the presidential election. Vacancies in the fiscal officership or on the board of trustees are filled by the remaining trustees.

Education
Students attend the Carrollton Exempted Village School District.

References

External links
County website

Townships in Carroll County, Ohio
Townships in Ohio